Southeast 17th Avenue and Rhine Street is a MAX Orange Line station located at 3424 Southeast 17th Avenue in Portland, Oregon's Brooklyn neighborhood, in the United States. Along These Lines is installed at the station.

It is the least busy station in the MAX network.

Bus service
, this station is served by the following bus lines:
17-Holgate/Broadway
70-12th/NE 33rd Ave

References

2015 establishments in Oregon
Brooklyn, Portland, Oregon
MAX Light Rail stations
MAX Orange Line
Railway stations in Portland, Oregon
Railway stations in the United States opened in 2015